A JD–MBA is a dual degree program in which students jointly earn Juris Doctor and Master of Business Administration degrees. The programs are commonly offered in the United States and Canada by universities' graduate business and law schools. They allow students to use credits from certain classes in one degree to count for course requirements at the other degree. This allows students to complete both the three-year JD and two-year MBA programs in four years, not the five years the degrees would take if done consecutively.

Application Process 
Due to the JD/MBA dual degree programs distinction schools have varying application processes. Some schools, like Harvard, will need their applicants to apply and get accepted to both their law school and business school, for their J.D and M.B.A programs respectively. Also, during a graduate student's first year of either law or business school, they can apply for the other school to start their dual-degree program.

J.D General Application:

The J.D application process requires the applicant to provide:

 University Application Forms
 LSAT Exam Scores
 Sometimes GRE Exam scores in replacement of LSAT
 Undergraduate G.P.A. and transcript
 Letters of Recommendations
 Personal Statement
 Resume/C.V/Work experience

M.B.A. General Application

The M.B.A application process usually requires the applicant to provide:

 University Application Forms
 GMAT Exam Scores
 GRE Exam scores sometimes in replacement of GMAT
 M.B.A application essay(s)
 M.B.A application personal statements
 Resume/C.V/Work Experience

Other Application Options 
Many schools may not need the entirety of both law and business school applications. Schools, such as University of Pennsylvania have JD/MBA programs were they will directly apply to the program through either the law school or business school and use the respective schools Exam (LSAT for Law school, GMAT for business school, GRE possible replacement for both). Some schools offer both applying directly to the dual degree program as well as options of applying through either the university's respective law school and/or the university's respective business school such as NYU.

By country

Canada 
Top-ranking Canadian JD/MBA programs include a four-year JD/MBA at the University of British Columbia, University of Toronto, York University, Queen's University, the three-year JD/MBA at the University of Western Ontario and the three and a half year JD/MBA at the University of Ottawa. Students may apply to the joint program before matriculating to either program, or after matriculating to either law school or business school.

United States 
Many schools in the US offer JD/MBA programs. There are three common lengths of time offered for JD/MBA programs: three-year, three-and-a-half-year, or four-year. All schools listed below with three- or three-and-a-half-year programs also offer a four-year option for the program. Schools listed under the four-year programs only offer a four-year (eight-semester) program.

Three-year programs 
Three-year programs can usually be completed in six semesters. Most programs allow for two summer internships; however, some require students to take classes for at least one summer. Here are some schools that offer three-year JD/MBA programs:

Belmont University
Columbia University
George Mason University
Northwestern University
Southern Methodist University
Temple University
University of Chicago
University of Georgia
University of Notre Dame
University of Pennsylvania
University of Richmond
Yale University

Three-and-a-half-year programs 
Three-and-a-half-year programs are supposed to be completed in seven semesters. Here are some schools that offer three-and-a-half-year JD/MBA programs:

Boston University
Duke University
Emory University
University of South Carolina

Four-year programs 
Four-year programs can be completed in eight semesters. Here are some schools that offer only four-year JD/MBA programs:

Brigham Young University
College of William & Mary
Cornell University
Elon University
Georgetown University
Harvard University
Liberty University
New York University
Northeastern University
Pepperdine University
Santa Clara University
Stanford University
University at Buffalo
University of California, Berkeley
University of Houston
University of Missouri
University of Utah
University of Wyoming
Villanova University

References 
 Creating a Shorter Path to a JD-MBA. Wall Street Journal, May 20, 2009
 Deciding Whether to Pursue a JD and an MBA: When it Makes Sense to Go "Two For One"

See also
 PhD-MBA

Business qualifications
Legal education
Law degrees
Dual academic degrees